Cadence Records was an American record company based in New York City whose labels had a picture of a metronome.  It was founded by Archie Bleyer, who had been the musical director and orchestra leader for Arthur Godfrey in 1952. Cadence also launched a short-lived jazz subsidiary, Candid Records.

The first recording star for Cadence was a Godfrey alumnus, Julius La Rosa.  Other Godfrey alumni signed to the label included the Chordettes. Bleyer had written a few hit songs in 1932–34 (Fletcher Henderson's "Business in F" is a good example) and had a band that recorded for ARC in 1934 and 1935 (his records were issued on Vocalion, Melotone, Perfect and Romeo). According to legend, Bleyer was fired from the Godfrey show when he signed someone Godfrey regarded as a rival to a record deal (Godfrey later fired singer Julius La Rosa in October 1954, causing a storm of controversy at the time).

The label also produced the early hits of Andy Williams and the Everly Brothers, as well as Johnny Tillotson and Lenny Welch.  Virtuoso jazz/classical pianist Don Shirley was signed with Cadence in the 1950s and 1960s. One of Cadence's most popular songs in the 1950s was "Eloise", written and sung by Kay Thompson.

Cadence charted nearly 100 American singles between 1953 and 1964. It also produced the 1962 smash bestselling  parody album The First Family, starring comedic actor Vaughn Meader. Acclaimed at that time as the fastest-selling album in history, this White House satire on the Kennedy family and Capitol Hill politics remained at #1 on the Billboard 200 for 12 weeks. Featuring Meader's impression of President John F. Kennedy, the sketch revue also included takes on First Lady Jackie Kennedy, newsmakers like Soviet Premier Nikita Khrushchev, and then Vice-President Lyndon Johnson. A sequel album, The First Family Volume Two, released in March 1963, reached #4. Both albums were immediately recalled and taken out of print following Kennedy's assassination in Dallas.

The departures of the Everly Brothers in 1960 (to Warner Bros. Records) and of Andy Williams in 1961 (to Columbia Records), along with radical changes in public taste and the music business brought on by the British Invasion, led to the company's rapid decline. By 1964, Bleyer opted to shut down Cadence. He had competing offers from Kapp Records, Liberty Records and Andy Williams, who wished to keep his own master recordings away from any other buyer in competition with his new material.  Bleyer's sale specified a complete purchase of the entire Cadence catalog (including Candid Records), which Williams accepted.
 Williams reissued his old albums on Columbia and formed Barnaby Records to manage the rest of the Cadence catalog.

See also
List of record labels

References

External links
The Cadence Records Story
singles discography
Cadence Records on the Internet Archive's Great 78 Project

American record labels
Defunct record labels of the United States
Pop record labels
Record labels established in 1952
Record labels disestablished in 1964